is a private university, established in 1928. 

Kurume University is located in Kurume (Chikugo district), Fukuoka (on the island of Kyushu), Japan.

History 
1928 Kyūshū Medical School established. (A precursor of Kurume university)
1949 Faculty of Commerce was established on the Mii Campus.

Undergraduate Faculties and Departments 
Faculty of Literature
Intercultural Studies
Psychology
Information Sociology
Social Welfare
Faculty of Economics
Cultural Economics
Economics
Faculty of Commerce
Commerce
Faculty of Law
Jurisprudence
International Politics
School of medicine
School of Medicine
School of Nursing

Institutes 
Institute of Foreign Language Education

Graduate Schools 
Graduate School of Comparative Studies of International Cultures and Societies
Graduate School of Psychology
Graduate School of Commerce
Graduate School of Medicine
Graduate and Professional School of Law

Campuses 
Mii Campus
The Faculties of Literature, Economics, Commerce, Law and Graduate and Professional School of Law
Asahi-machi Campus
school of medicine, Kurume University Hospital
Kurume University Beijing Educational Exchange Center (China)

University Hospital 
Kurume University Hospital
Kurume University Medical Center
Kurume University Rehabilitation Center

Main attached research institutes (14 research institutes) 
Institute of Comparative Studies of International Cultures and Societies (Mii Campus)
Institute of Foreign Language Education (Mii Campus)
Institute of Industrial Economies (Mii Campus)
Research Center for Innovative Cancer Therapy (Asahi-machi Campus)
The international center (Mii Campus)        etc.

Libraries 
2 Libraries (Mii Campus, Asahi-machi Campus)

External links
Official site
Kurume University Intensive Japanese Program

Kurume
Private universities and colleges in Japan
Universities and colleges in Fukuoka Prefecture